Ronald M. Spores (born January 25, 1931) is an American academic anthropologist, archaeologist and ethnohistorian, whose research career has centered on the pre-Columbian cultures of Mesoamerica. He is Professor Emeritus of anthropology at Vanderbilt University's College of Arts and Science, where he has been a faculty member for over four decades.  Spores is most renowned for his scholarship conducted on the cultural history of the Oaxacan region in southwestern Mexico. In particular, he has made many contributions on the Mixtec culture, investigating its archaeological sites, ethnohistorical documents, political economies, and ethnohistory in both the pre-Columbian and Colonial eras. He was co-director of the Proyecto Arqueológico de la Ciudad Yucundaa Pueblo Viejo de Teposcolula, Oaxaca, sponsored by the Fundación Alfredo Harp Helu, the National Geographic Society, and INAH (2004–2010), and currently (2017) directs research on the sixteenth century Casa del Cacique de Yanhuitlan, Oaxaca, and related investigation of the surrounding Prehispanic-Colonial city and region. He is also Research Associate at the American Museum of Natural History, New York, and at the University of Oregon and investigator on the Proyecto Geoparque de la Mixteca Alta, Universidad Nacional Autónoma de México/UNESCO, centered at Yanhuitlan, Oaxaca (2016-2017).  Recent research relates to the colonial Manila Galleon trade between the Philippines and Acapulco.

Biography
Spores obtained his undergraduate Bachelor of Science degree from the University of Oregon in 1953. His graduate studies were undertaken at the Universidad de las Américas in Cholula, Mexico, where he obtained an M.A. in 1960. Spores continued graduate studies at Harvard, where he completed a Master's thesis in 1963 and his doctorate in anthropology in 1964.

Published works

Authored books
Spores, Ronald and Andrew Balkansky (2013) The Mixtecs of Oaxaca: Ancient Times to the Present.  Norman: University of Oklahoma Press.  
 
 
 
Spores, Ronald and Nelly Robles Garcia (eds.), Yucundaa.  La Ciudad Mixteca y su Transformación Prehispánica-Colonial, México: INAH, 2015.

Articles

References

Further reading

External links
 

American Mesoamericanists
Mesoamerican archaeologists
Mixtec scholars
20th-century Mesoamericanists
American archaeologists
American anthropologists
University of Oregon alumni
Harvard University alumni
Vanderbilt University faculty
1931 births
Living people
Universidad de las Américas Puebla alumni